The Hiddensee treasure was found in 1873 on the German island of Hiddensee in the Baltic Sea by chance, during rebuilding after significant flooding in 1872 and 1873.

Description and dating 

It is the largest discovery of Viking gold artifacts in Germany.

The jewelry dates from the late Viking Age, . The pendants include both Norse pagan and Christian symbolsThor's hammer of Mjölnir and the cross. It is possible that the jewelry originally belonged to the family of the Danish King Harald Bluetooth.

Exhibition 
A replica of the Hiddensee treasure can be seen today in the Hiddensee Local History Museum.

See also 
 Viking art
 Curmsun Disc

Further reading 
 Claudia Hoffmann: Der Goldschmuck von Hiddensee. In: WELT-KULTUR-ERBE. Nr. 01/2009, OCLC 265909878

References

External links 

 Stralsund Museum: The Gold Jewellery of Hiddensee 

Treasure troves of Germany
10th century in Germany
Archaeology of Germany
Harald Bluetooth
Viking art
1873 archaeological discoveries